Protagonist is a 2007 American documentary film about the parallels between human life and Euripidean dramatic structure. The film was written and directed by Jessica Yu.

It featured extensive interviews with German terrorist Hans-Joachim Klein, ex-gay Christian evangelist Mark Pierpont, Mexican bank-robber Joe Loya, and martial-arts enthusiast Mark Salzman (the director's husband). Interspersed with the interviews are scenes from ancient Greek drama performed by puppets.

External links 
 Protagonist at Alive Mind Media
 

2007 films
2007 documentary films
2007 independent films
2000s American films
2000s English-language films
American documentary films
American independent films
Documentary films about theatre
Films directed by Jessica Yu
IFC Films films